2nd Online Film Critics Society Awards 
January 3, 1999

Best Film: 
 Saving Private Ryan 
The 2nd Online Film Critics Society Awards, honoring the best in film for 1998, were given on 3 January 1999.

Winners and nominees

References 

1998
1998 film awards